Geraldine Anne Allen (born 1950) is a botanist, professor of biology, and herbarium curator at the University of Victoria in British Columbia, Canada. She obtained formal education at the University of British Columbia and Oregon State University, earning a Doctor of Philosophy degree in botany and plant pathology from the latter in 1981. During her career, she has authored or co-authored over 50 publications, including genera chapters for Flora of North America and the Jepson Manual. She also has authored several species of the Erythronium genus.

Education
Allen earned Bachelor of Science and Master of Science degrees from the University of British Columbia in 1972 and 1975, respectively, and a Doctor of Philosophy degree in botany and plant pathology from Oregon State University in 1981. Her master's thesis was entitled The Systematics of Indigenous Species of Hieracium Asteraceae in British Columbia and her dissertation was Biosystematics of a Western North American Polyploid Complex in the Genus Aster.

Career

Allen is professor of biology and herbarium curator at the University of Victoria in British Columbia, Canada. During her career, she has authored or co-authored over 50 publications, including the Flora of North America chapters on the genera Erythronium, Eucephalus, and Symphyotrichum. Her work also has included chapters for the Jepson Manual on genera Symphyotrichum, Erythronium, and Doellingeria. Allen has authored several species of the Erythronium genus.

Personal life
While Allen was writing her master's thesis, she was married to Arthur Guppy, and she used variations of the name Geraldine Anne Allen Guppy as author for her thesis, her dissertation, and her other 1970s publications.

Selected publications

Citations

References

External links

1950 births
Living people
University of British Columbia alumni
Oregon State University alumni
Academic staff of the University of Victoria
Canadian botanists
Canadian women botanists
Canadian women curators